Guy Lindsay Scott (born 1 June 1944) is a Zambian politician, who served as acting President of Zambia from 2014 to 2015, and was the Vice President from 2011 to 2014. 

Scott became acting President upon Michael Sata's death in office on 28 October 2014. This made him the first Head of State of European descent in Africa since F. W. de Klerk in the 1990s, and the first-ever under a democratic Government.

Early life and education
Guy Lindsay Scott was born on 1 June 1944 in the border city of Livingstone, the pre-1935 capital of what was then Northern Rhodesia (today Zambia). His father, Alec Scott, was a doctor who had emigrated to Northern Rhodesia from Glasgow, Scotland, UK in 1927 to work on Cecil Rhodes' railways, whilst his mother Grace, had emigrated from England in 1940. Scott is the brother of Alexander "Sandy" Scott, a noted scientist, who was awarded the Fisheries Society of the British Isles's Beverton Medal in 2014 for his contributions to fisheries science. During the 1950s, his father was a member of parliament for the Federation of Rhodesia and Nyasaland, representing Lusaka as an Independent. Scott's eventual participation in politics was largely inspired by his father, who had been an ally of Zambian nationalists and had even founded several newspapers that advocated for independence.

Scott completed his primary and secondary education at Springvale School and Peterhouse Boys' School, respectively, both located in what was then Southern Rhodesia (today Zimbabwe). He continued his education in England, where he received his undergraduate degree in economics in 1965 from Trinity Hall, a constituent college of Cambridge University. Scott then returned home to join the government of newly independent Zambia, in which he was a planner within the Ministry of Finance. During this time he was also the deputy editor of a publication called The Business and Economy of East and Central Africa.

In 1970, Scott established an agribusiness venture known as Walkover Estates, which focused on producing high-value crops such as irrigated wheat, strawberries, and a wide range of off-season vegetables. Strawberries produced by Walkover Estates were often featured in local Sainsbury's supermarkets. During this time, Scott was considered a model employer who spoke the local language and was known for his inclusive parties.

Scott eventually returned to England to continue his education at the University of Sussex, where he studied cognitive sciences and artificial intelligence, receiving his Master's degree in 1983 and his doctorate in 1986. His doctoral thesis was entitled "Local and global interpretation of moving images". He went on to study robotics at Oxford University.

Political career
In 1990, Scott joined the Movement for Multi-Party Democracy (MMD) and was elected to be Chair of its Agriculture Committee during the first party convention.

He was elected as Member of Parliament for Mpika Central on the MMD ticket in the National Assembly during the 1991 general election and was subsequently appointed as Minister of Agriculture, Food and Fisheries. He presided over a number of policy reforms and was responsible for managing the "drought of the century" in January and February 1992. There was no reserve maize in Zambia and none in southern Africa, so emergency arrangements had to be made to import it from overseas and move it into Zambia on dilapidated rail and road networks. He also oversaw the drought recovery "bumper harvest" of 1992–93. However, he was sacked by President Chiluba on 15 April 1993.

In 1996, Scott resigned from the MMD to form the Lima Party together with Ben Kapita, the president of the ZNFU. He piloted the merger between the Lima Party and other parties including Dean Mungomba's Zambia Democratic Congress to form the Zambia Alliance for Progress. In 2001, he returned to politics and joined the Patriotic Front, returning to the National Assembly after being elected MP for Lusaka Central in the 2006 general election.

Vice-President

A presidential election was held on 20 September 2011, and final results released on 23 September 2011 showed the Patriotic Front's presidential candidate, Michael Sata, winning over MMD's Rupiah Banda by a large margin. Scott was sworn in as Vice-President of the Republic of Zambia on 29 September 2011, the first white Zambian leader since its independence.

Shortly after his election, The Guardian quoted Scott as saying: "I have long suspected Zambia is moving from a post-colonial to a cosmopolitan condition. People's minds are changing: they are no longer sitting back and dwelling on what was wrong about colonialism". Referring to a 2012 meeting with former U.S. President George W. Bush (who sponsors various charity initiatives in Zambia), he said, "when they introduced me as Vice President, he thought they were kidding".

Acting President
After Michael Sata's death on 28 October 2014, Scott became acting president for an interim period of no more than 90 days until a new election could be held to permanently fill the office, as required by Article 38 of the Constitution of Zambia.

Since the parentage clause of Article 34 of the Constitution of Zambia requires that both parents of presidential candidates are "Zambian by birth or descent," due to his parents being Scottish and English immigrants, Scott was considered ineligible to stand for the office in the January 2015 election. That provision had been put in place by President Frederick Chiluba to prevent Kenneth Kaunda – whose father was born in what became Malawi – from becoming president. However, a previous judgement by the Zambian Supreme Court, in a similar case in 1998, could have validated him as a potential candidate. Nevertheless, Scott did not stand as the presidential candidate for his political party, the Patriotic Front.

On 3 November 2014, Scott dismissed Edgar Lungu as Secretary General of the Patriotic Front; however, he reinstated him a day later, after street protests in Lusaka. On 17 December 2014, Scott rejected calls from cabinet members asking him to resign as acting president.

Lungu, standing as the PF's candidate, won the January 2015 presidential by-election and succeeded Scott as Zambia's 6th President on 25 January 2015.

Post-Presidency
Scott left the PF before the 2016 general election. In 2021, he joined the United Party for National Development.

In 2019 Scott published Adventures in Zambian Politics: A Story in Black and White, a book about both the history of Zambia and his own political career.

Personal life
Scott married British-born doctor Charlotte Harland Scott, in a ceremony at the Lusaka Civic Centre in 1994. They currently reside in Lusaka. Scott has Parkinson's disease.

References

External links

 Profile on the party website
 Interview on BBC Hardtalk

|-

1944 births
Alumni of Peterhouse Boys' School
Alumni of the University of Sussex
Alumni of Trinity Hall, Cambridge
Living people
Members of the National Assembly of Zambia
Zambian businesspeople
Movement for Multi-Party Democracy politicians
Patriotic Front (Zambia) politicians
People from Livingstone, Zambia
Presidents of Zambia
Zambian people of British descent
Vice-presidents of Zambia
Zambian Anglicans
White Zambian people
Zambian people of English descent
Agriculture ministers of Zambia
Zambian people of Scottish descent